Jean-Désiré Sikely (born 27 January 1951) is a Ivorian former professional football forward who spent his career in France and represented the Ivory Coast national team internationally.

References
 
 
 
 

1951 births
Living people
People from Lagunes District
Association football forwards
Ivorian footballers
Ivory Coast international footballers
1984 African Cup of Nations players
Olympique de Marseille players
SC Toulon players
FC Martigues players
Montpellier HSC players
FC Sète 34 players
Ligue 1 players
Ligue 2 players
Ivorian expatriate footballers
Ivorian expatriate sportspeople in France
Expatriate footballers in France